The House of Trent is a 1933 British drama film directed by Norman Walker and starring Anne Grey, Wendy Barrie, Moore Marriott and Peter Gawthorne. It follows a doctor who faces both a scandal and a moral dilemma when a patient of his dies while he is making love to a press magnate's daughter. It was also released as Trent's Folly.

The film was made at Ealing Studios.

Cast
 Anne Grey as Rosemary
 John Stuart as John Trent
 Wendy Barrie as Angela
 Peter Gawthorne as Lord Fairdown
 Hope Davey as Joan
 Norah Baring as Barbara
 Hubert Harben as Editor
 Moore Marriott as Ferrier
 Jack Raine as Peter
 Dora Gregory as Mary
 Estelle Winwood as Charlotte
 Hay Plumb as Jury Foreman
 Victor Stanley as Spriggs
 Humberston Wright as Coachman

References

Bibliography
 Low, Rachael. Filmmaking in 1930s Britain. George Allen & Unwin, 1985.
 Wood, Linda. British Films, 1927-1939. British Film Institute, 1986.

External links

1933 films
1933 drama films
1930s English-language films
Films directed by Norman Walker
British drama films
Films set in England
Ealing Studios films
British black-and-white films
1930s British films